Trailer tracking is tracking the position of an articulated vehicle’s trailer unit through a tracking device fitted to the trailer. A communication network or satellite network is then used to transfer this positional data to a centralized collection point. Trailer tracking is used to increase productivity by optimizing the use of trailer fleets.

Trailer tracking system
Trailer tracking systems can provide essential information to trailer operators on; status, location, door activity, coupling/uncoupling, and history. These systems utilize the information to provide reliable and protected services to shippers of perishable commodities.

Trailer Tracking is also a trucking term in which, when a Semi turns a corner the trailer tires will be closer to the curb (even jump the curb if semi turns to sharp) than the truck cab will be.

Trailer tracking systems require 4 essential components to operate.

 Tracking Device
 Communication Network
 Back-end Server and Database
 User Interface Software

See also
 GPS tracking server
 GPS tracking unit

References

External links 
 Important things to know about trailer tracking

Logistics